HMS Havock was a  torpedo boat destroyer of the British Royal Navy built by the Yarrow shipyard. She was one of the first destroyers ordered by the Royal Navy, and the first to be delivered.

Design and construction
She differed from her sister ship in having 2 locomotive boilers placed end-to-end, while Hornet had 8 water tube boilers. This resulted in an obvious external difference, since Hornet had 4 funnels (with the centre pair close together) while Havock had 2 closely spaced funnels. She was launched on 12 August 1893.

Armament
Havock was armed with a single 12-pounder gun mounted on a pedestal at the conning position, an exposed location that was extremely wet in even moderately rough weather.  Three  6 pounder QF guns were mounted, with two either side of, and slightly abaft of, the conning position, and the third placed near the stern just aft of the torpedo tubes. Three 18-inch (450mm) torpedo tubes were fitted, with two in a turntable towards the stern, and able to fire on either side. The third torpedo tube was fitted at the bow, with the torpedo ejected from the tube by a gunpowder charge. This fitting was later removed, as it was found that the fitting was extremely exposed, and the boat had a tendency to outpace its own torpedo when running at high speed.

Career
Havock "behaved well" on trials in late 1893, with her top speed indicating that she was capable of keeping up with battleships. It was noted that her trial demonstrated better fuel efficiency than her sister, Hornet.

In 1896 Havock was in reserve at Portsmouth. In 1899–1900 she was re-boilered with conventional ship water tube boilers, changing her silhouette to have three funnels, with the centre one somewhat thicker than the others. By this period such a layout was considered standard for torpedo boat destroyers.

Havocks career was spent entirely around the British Isles.

Lieutenant H. C. J. R. West was appointed in command on 1 March 1902, and shortly thereafter commissioned her for service with the Medway Instructional Flotilla. She took part in the Coronation Review for King Edward VII on 16 August 1902, with Lieutenant L. T. Jones temporarily in command from 8 August.

Fate
Havock was sold on 14 May 1912 and was broken up.

Notes

Citations

Bibliography

 

 

Havock-class destroyers
Ships built in Cubitt Town
1893 ships